The team dressage at the 2009 FEI European Jumping and Dressage Championships took place between August 25 and 26 at Windsor Castle.

Medalists

Results

Italics indicates dropped score.

External links
Official results

Dressage, team
Sport in Berkshire